Lars Tommy Persson (born 23 December 1954 in Östra Grevie, Skåne) is a retired long-distance runner from Sweden. He represented his native country twice at the Summer Olympics (1980 and 1984) in the men's marathon, finishing in 30th place in Moscow. Persson, nicknamed "Tomis", won the 1985 Stockholm Marathon.

Achievements

References

1954 births
Living people
Swedish male long-distance runners
Athletes (track and field) at the 1980 Summer Olympics
Athletes (track and field) at the 1984 Summer Olympics
Olympic athletes of Sweden